Gathbandhan (Alliance) is an Indian television action drama romance series that was aired from 15 January to 27 November 2019 on Colors TV by airing 224 episodes. Produced by Jay Mehta under Jay Production, it starred Shruti Sharma, Abrar Qazi and Sonali Naik. It is the love story of Don of Dombiwaali Mumbai and IPS from Surendranagar

Plot
Dhanak Parekh from Surendranagar, Gujarat and Raghu Bharat Jadhav from Mumbai, Maharashtra , are two people with clashing personalities who ultimately become tied by the strings of marriage, friendship, and love.

Raghu is a petty criminal, a goon who has a fearsome reputation. Shortly he becomes one of the most powerful Dons in Mumbai. Savitri, his mother, controls their organization, and encourages him to resort to violent acts to increase their wealth and reputation. Dhanak is an aspiring IPS officer who keeps on the right side of the law. Raghu falls in love with her at first sight and forces her into marriage by holding her family as hostages. Dhanak hates Raghu and his lawlessness at first, but soon falls for him. After that she started loving him more than he loved her. Savitri and Maya, one of Raghu's friends, try to create misunderstandings between the pair, but they always manage to sort things out.

When Raghu's father, Bharat, returns after being presumed dead, things get more dangerous. Bharat and his companions engage in acts of terrorism, which causes Dhanak to lose her job. They then kidnap her sister. Raghu tries to save her, but fails, she is killed by Bharat and he blames her death on Raghu; He thinks Dhanak's sister was killed by him. As pressure builds around Raghu, he begins to believe himself guilty. He is arrested and sentenced to jail for five years.

5 years later

Raghu is released and returns to see Dhanak and their son Raunak. Despite still madly loving him, she asks him to stay away because she has still not forgiven him for her sister's death. Akshay, Dhanak's boss and friend, tries to separate Raghu and Dhanak forever. However, Raghu becomes an incredibly successful businessman in Mumbai after he sets up his new company RJ Industries, and eventually hires both Akshay and Dhanak as his staff.

Soon Dhanak falls for Raghu again, because she can't hold her love and affection for Raghu by faking it. Raghu, Dhanak and Raunak are reunited, and Savitri comes to love and accept her daughter-in-law.

Again Maya and Akshay collaborate to destroy Raghu by framing a murder which he didn't commit. But Raghu, Dhanak and their family reunites to prove his innocence and defeats Maya and Akshay.

Cast

Main
Shruti Sharma as ACP Dhanak Parekh Jadhav – Mahendra's eldest daughter; Parag, Sejal and Preeti's sister; Raghu's wife; Raunak's mother
Abrar Qazi as Raghunath "Raghu" Jadhav – Savitri and Bharat's son; Dhanak's husband; Raunak's father

Recurring
Sonali Naik as Savitri "Mai" Jadhav – Bharat's wife; Raghu's mother; Raunak's grandmother
Sanjay Batra as Bharat Jadhav – Savitri's husband; Raghu's father; Raunak's grandfather
Veer Bhanushali as Raunak Jadhav – Dhanak and Raghu's son
Kinshuk Mahajan as Akshay Kapoor – Dhanak's obsessed lover
Pragati Chourasiya as Maya Jaiswal – Raghu's obsessed lover
Nitin Goswami as ACP Ramesh Tawade – Corrupt officer
Varsha Dhandale as Shakubai – Savitri's friend
Smitha as Manorama Parekh – Mahendra's mother; Parag, Dhanak, Sejal and Preeti's grandmother
Rajiv Kumar as Mahendra Parekh – Manorama's son; Parag, Dhanak, Sejal and Preeti's father; Raunak's grandfather
Priyanka Choudhary as Sejal Parekh – Mahendra's second daughter; Parag, Dhanak and Preeti's sister; Vikram's ex-fiancée
Alisha Parveen as Preeti Parekh – Mahendra's youngest daughter; Parag, Dhanak and Sejal's sister (Dead)
Abbas Ghaznavi as Parag Parekh – Mahendra's son; Dhanak, Sejal and Preeti's brother
Tanay Aul as Aslam Sheikh – Raghu's namesake brother
Sahitya Pansare as Sunil Kumar Singh – Raghu's namesake brother
Nisha Pareek as Sheetal Shrivastav
Sapna Thakur as Lakshmi Gaitonde
Amit Pandey as Deven
Imran Nazir Khan as Director Ganesh

Special appearances

Gauahar Khan
Mika Singh
Drashti Dhami

Adaptation
The plot is taken and started airing in Star Maa called Neevelle Neevelle from 21 December 2020 replacing Big Boss season 4 and which ended on 17 July 2021 completing 159 episodes.

References

2019 Indian television series debuts
Indian drama television series
Colors TV original programming
Hindi-language television shows
Indian romance television series